Savali Talavou Ale is an American Samoan politician. He has served as the Speaker of the American Samoa House of Representatives since 2007. Ale, who was first elected to the House of Representatives in 1981, is also the longest serving current member of the American Samoa House of Representatives, as of 2015.

He is originally from Fagali'i, American Samoa, but now resides in the village of 'Ili'ili. Ale married his wife, Sakala Mautofu Ale, July 16, 1977, at a ceremony in Carson, California. The couple had eleven biological children, as well as several other children the family had adopted and raised. Both Savali Talavou Ale and Sakala Mautofu Ale were ordained deacons in the Congregational Christian Church in American Samoa (CCCAS).

Biography

Personal life
Ale's wife, Sakala Mautofu Ale (Poloa), died from a sudden illness on Saturday, September 5, 2015, at the age of 59. The couple had been married for 38 years and had nine children. During his first term as Speaker of the American Samoa House of Representatives, the chiefly title "Savali" was bestowed upon him. He is a member of the Congregational Church.

Education and early career
After graduating from Leone High School, he attended the Cannon's College of Commerce and later received a Bachelor of Science in Business Administration from California Baptist College in 1977. He also took summer courses at both Oregon University (1978) and at the University of Hawai'i (1979). He later moved back to American Samoa where he became a school teacher at Leone High School. He later worked for the Tax Office and as the supervisor of the payroll division at Van Camp Seafood Company.

Political career
Savali was first elected to the American Samoa House of Representatives in the 1981 elections and won re-election from the 1980s and through the 2010s. The Speaker of the House appointed him Chairman of the Budget and Appropriations Committee, a position which allowed Savali to utilize his knowledge of commerce. Another of his committee assignments was to work on the review of the American Samoa Constitution.

He was first elected to the House of Representatives in 1981. Ale, who has never lost re-election, has been re-elected to the House during each successive general election from the 1980s and 2010s, making him the House's longest-serving member, as of 2015.

On November 7, 2006, incumbent Speaker Matagi Mailo Ray McMoore lost re-election to the House of Representatives in the general election. Savali, who was Vice Speaker of the House from 2005 to 2007, was elected Speaker of the American Samoa House of Representatives in January 2007 after he received eleven more votes than his opponent, longtime Rep. Gaoteote Palie Tofau.

Savali was challenged  by Ituau Rep. Taotasi Archie Soliai for the Speakership in 2010, but Savali won re-election as Speaker. Rep. Taotasi Archie Soliai once again challenged Savali for the position of Speaker of the 33rd legislature (2013–2015) in January 2013. Ale defeated Soliai with a vote of 13-7. Rep. Soliai was later defeated for re-election on November 4, 2014, in the general election.

He was unanimously re-elected Speaker of the House of Representatives for the 34th Legislature on January 3, 2015.

References

|-

1953 births
American Samoan Congregationalists
Living people
Members of the American Samoa House of Representatives
People from 'Ili'ili
Speakers of the American Samoa House of Representatives
American Samoa Republicans